Ecofeminism is a branch of feminism and political ecology. Ecofeminist thinkers draw on the concept of gender to analyse the relationships between humans and the natural world. The term was coined by the French writer Françoise d'Eaubonne in her book Le Féminisme ou la Mort (1974). Ecofeminist theory asserts a feminist perspective of Green politics that calls for an egalitarian, collaborative society in which there is no one dominant group. Today, there are several branches of ecofeminism, with varying approaches and analyses, including liberal ecofeminism, spiritual/cultural ecofeminism, and social/socialist ecofeminism (or materialist ecofeminism). Interpretations of ecofeminism and how it might be applied to social thought include ecofeminist art, social justice and political philosophy, religion, contemporary feminism, and poetry.

Ecofeminist analysis explores the connections between women and nature in culture, economy, religion, politics, literature and iconography, and addresses the parallels between the oppression of nature and the oppression of women. These parallels include but are not limited to seeing women and nature as property, seeing men as the curators of culture and women as the curators of nature, and how men dominate women and humans dominate nature. Ecofeminism emphasizes that both women and nature must be respected.

Though the scope of ecofeminist analysis is dynamic, American author and ecofeminist Charlene Spretnak has offered one way of categorizing ecofeminist work: 1) through the study of political theory as well as history; 2) through the belief and study of nature-based religions; 3) through environmentalism.

Overview
While diverse ecofeminist perspectives have emerged from female activists and thinkers all over the world, academic studies of ecofeminism have been dominated by North American universities. Thus, in the 1993 essay entitled "Ecofeminism: Toward Global Justice and Planetary Health" authors Greta Gaard and Lori Gruen outline what they call the "ecofeminist framework". The essay provides a wealth of data and statistics in addition to outlining the theoretical aspects of the ecofeminist critique. The framework described is intended to establish ways of viewing and understanding our current global situations so that we can better understand how we arrived at this point and what may be done to ameliorate the ills.

Building on the work of North American scholars Rosemary Ruether and Carolyn Merchant, Gaard and Gruen argue that there are four sides to this framework:

 The mechanistic materialist model of the universe that resulted from the scientific revolution and the subsequent reduction of all things into mere resources to be optimized, dead inert matter to be used.
 The rise of patriarchal religions and their establishment of gender hierarchies along with their denial of immanent divinity.
 The self and other dualisms and the inherent power and domination ethic it entails.
 Capitalism and its claimed intrinsic need for the exploitation, destruction and instrumentalization of animals, earth and people for the sole purpose of creating wealth.

They hold that these four factors have brought us to what ecofeminists see as a "separation between nature and culture" that is for them the root source of our planetary ills.

Ecofeminism developed out of anarcha-feminist concerns with abolishing all forms of domination, while focusing on the oppressive nature of humanity's relationship to the natural world. According to Françoise d'Eaubonne in her book Le Féminisme ou la Mort (1974), ecofeminism relates the oppression and domination of all marginalized groups (women, people of color, children, the poor) to the oppression and domination of nature (animals, land, water, air, etc.). In the book, the author argues that oppression, domination, exploitation, and colonization from the Western patriarchal society has directly caused irreversible environmental damage. Françoise d'Eaubonne was an activist and organizer, and her writing encouraged the eradication of all social injustice, not just injustice against women and the environment.

This tradition includes a number of influential texts including: Women and Nature (Susan Griffin 1978), The Death of Nature (Carolyn Merchant 1980) and Gyn/Ecology (Mary Daly 1978). These texts helped to propel the association between domination by men of women and the domination of culture over nature. From these texts feminist activism of the 1980s linked ideas of ecology and the environment. Movements such as the National Toxics Campaign, Mothers of East Los Angeles (MELA), and Native Americans for a Clean Environment (NACE) were led by women devoted to issues of human health and environmental justice. Writings in this circle discussed ecofeminism drawing from Green Party politics, peace movements, and direct action movements.

Gendering nature

Ecofeminist theory asserts that capitalism reflects only paternalistic and patriarchal values. This notion implies that the effects of capitalism have not benefited women and has led to a harmful split between nature and culture. In the 1970s, early ecofeminists discussed that the split can only be healed by the feminine instinct for nurture and holistic knowledge of nature's processes.

Since then, several ecofeminist scholars have made the distinction that it is not because women are female or "feminine" that they relate to nature, but because of their similar states of oppression by the same male-dominant forces. The marginalization is evident in the gendered language used to describe nature, such as "Mother Earth" or "Mother Nature", and the animalized language used to describe women in degroratory terms. Some discourses link women specifically to the environment because of their traditional social role as a nurturer and caregiver. Ecofeminists following in this line of thought believe that these connections are illustrated through the coherence of socially-labeled values associated with 'femininity' such as nurturing, which are present both among women and in nature.

Alternatively, ecofeminist and activist Vandana Shiva wrote that women have a special connection to the environment through their daily interactions and that this connection has been underestimated. According to Shiva, women in subsistence economies who produce "wealth in partnership with nature, have been experts in their own right of holistic and ecological knowledge of nature's processes". She makes the point that "these alternative modes of knowing, which are oriented to the social benefits and sustenance needs are not recognized by the capitalist reductionist paradigm, because it fails to perceive the interconnectedness of nature, or the connection of women's lives, work and knowledge with the creation of wealth (23)".  Shiva blames this failure on the Western patriarchal perceptions of development and progress. According to Shiva, patriarchy has labeled women, nature, and other groups not growing the economy as "unproductive". Similarly, Australian ecofeminist Ariel Salleh deepens this materialist ecofeminist approach in dialogue with green politics, ecosocialism, genetic engineering and climate policy.

Concepts

Modern science and ecofeminism 
In Ecofeminism (1993) authors Vandana Shiva and Maria Mies ponder modern science and its acceptance as a universal and value-free system. They view the dominant stream of modern science not as objective science but as a projection of Western men's values. The privilege of determining what is considered scientific knowledge and its usage has been controlled by men, and for the most part of history restricted to men. Many examples exist, including the medicalization of childbirth and the industrialization of plant reproduction.

A common claim within ecofeminist literature is that patriarchal structures justify their dominance through binary opposition, these include but are not limited to: heaven/earth, mind/body, male/female, human/animal, spirit/matter, culture/nature and white/non-white. Oppression, according to them, is reinforced by assuming truth in these binaries, which factuality they challenge, and instilling them as 'marvelous to behold' through what they consider to be religious and scientific constructs.

Vegetarian ecofeminism 

The application of ecofeminism to animal rights has established vegetarian ecofeminism, which asserts that "omitting the oppression of animals from feminist and ecofeminist analyses … is inconsistent with the activist and philosophical foundations of both feminism (as a "movement to end all forms of oppression") and ecofeminism." It puts into practice "the personal is political", as many ecofeminists believe that "meat-eating is a form of patriarchal domination…that suggests a link between male violence and a meat-based diet." During a 1995 interview with On the Issues, Carol J. Adams stated, "Manhood is constructed in our culture in part by access to meat-eating and control of other bodies, whether it's women or animals". According to Adams, "We cannot work for justice and challenge the oppression of nature without understanding that the most frequent way we interact with nature is by eating animals". Vegetarian ecofeminism combines sympathy with the analysis of culture and politics to refine a system of ethics and action.

Materialist ecofeminism 
The key activist-scholars in materialist ecofeminism are Maria Mies and Veronika Bennholdt-Thomsen in Germany; Vandana Shiva in India; Ariel Salleh in Australia; Mary Mellor in the UK; and Ana Isla in Peru. Materialist ecofeminism is not widely known in North America aside from the journal collective at Capitalism Nature Socialism. A materialist view connects institutions such as labor, power, and property as the source of domination over women and nature. There are connections made between these subjects because of the values of production and reproduction. This dimension of ecofeminism may also be referred to as "social feminism", "socialist ecofeminism", or "Marxist ecofeminism". According to Carolyn Merchant, "Social ecofeminism advocates the liberation of women through overturning economic and social hierarchies that turn all aspects of life into a market society that today even invades the womb". Ecofeminism in this sense seeks to eliminate social hierarchies which favor the production of commodities (dominated by men) over biological and social reproduction.

Spiritual and cultural ecofeminism 
Spiritual ecofeminism is another branch of ecofeminism, and it is popular among ecofeminist authors such as Starhawk, Riane Eisler, and Carol J. Adams. Starhawk calls this an earth-based spirituality, which recognizes that the Earth is alive, and that we are an interconnected community. Spiritual ecofeminism is not linked to one specific religion, but is centered around values of caring, compassion, and non-violence. Often, ecofeminists refer to more ancient traditions, such as the worship of Gaia, the Goddess of nature and spirituality (also known as Mother Earth). Wicca and Paganism are particularly influential to spiritual ecofeminism. Most Wicca covens demonstrate a deep respect for nature, a feminine outlook, and an aim to establish strong community values.

In her book Radical Ecology, Carolyn Merchant refers to spiritual ecofeminism as "cultural ecofeminism". According to Merchant, cultural ecofeminism, "celebrates the relationship between women and nature through the revival of ancient rituals centered on goddess worship, the moon, animals, and the female reproductive system." In this sense, cultural ecofeminists tend to value intuition, an ethic of caring, and human-nature interrelationships.

Environmental movements
Susan A. Mann, an eco-feminist and professor of sociological and feminist theory, considers the roles women played in these activisms to be the starter for ecofeminism in later centuries. Mann associates the beginning of ecofeminism not with feminists but with women of different races and class backgrounds who made connections among gender, race, class, and environmental issues. This ideal is upheld through the notion that in activist and theory circles marginalized groups must be included in the discussion. In early environmental and women's movements, issues of varying races and classes were often separated.

Beginning in the late 20th century, women worked in efforts to protect wildlife, food, air and water. These efforts depended largely on new developments in the environmental movement from influential writers, such as Henry David Thoreau, Aldo Leopold, John Muir, and Rachel Carson. Fundamental examples of women's efforts in the 20th century are the books Silent Spring by Rachel Carson and Refuge by Terry Tempest Williams.

Ecofeminist author Karen Warren lists Aldo Leopold's essay "Land Ethic" (1949) as a fundamental work to the ecofeminist conception, as Leopold was the first to pen an ethic for the land which understands all non-human parts of that community (animals, plants, land, air, water) as equal to and in a relationship with humans. This inclusive understanding of the environment launched the modern preservation movement and illustrated how issues can be viewed through a framework of caring.

Women have participated in environmental movements, specifically preservation and conservation beginning in the late nineteenth century and continuing into the early twentieth century.

Movements of the 1970s and 80s 

In India, in the state of Uttarakhand in 1973, women took part in the Chipko movement to protect forests from deforestation. Non-violent protest tactics were used to occupy trees so that loggers could not cut them down.

In Kenya in 1977, the Green Belt Movement was initiated by environmental and political activist Professor Wangari Maathai. It is a rural tree planting program led by women, which Maathai designed to help prevent desertification in the area. The program created a 'green belt' of at least 1,000 trees around villages, and gave participants the ability to take charge in their communities. In later years, the Green Belt Movement was an advocate for informing and empowering citizens through seminars for civic and environmental education, as well as holding national leaders accountable for their actions and instilling agency in citizens. The work of the Green Belt Movement continues today.

In 1978 in New York, mother and environmentalist Lois Gibbs led her community in protest after discovering that their entire neighborhood, Love Canal, was built on top of a toxic dump site. The toxins in the ground were causing illness among children and reproductive issues among women, as well as birth defects in babies born to pregnant women exposed to the toxins. The Love Canal movement eventually led to the evacuation and relocation of nearly 800 families by the federal government.

In 1980 and 1981, women like ecofeminist Ynestra King organized a peaceful protest at the Pentagon. Women stood, hand in hand, demanding equal rights (including social, economic, and reproductive rights) as well as an end to militaristic actions taken by the government and exploitation of the community (people and the environment). This movement is known as the Women's Pentagon Actions.

In 1985, the Akwesasne Mother's Milk Project was launched by Katsi Cook. This study was funded by the government, and investigated how the higher level of contaminants in water near the Mohawk reservation impacted babies. It revealed that through breast milk, Mohawk children were being exposed to 200% more toxins than children not on the reservation. Toxins contaminate water all over the world, but due to environmental racism, certain marginalized groups are exposed to a much higher amount.

The Greening of Harlem Coalition is another example of an ecofeminist movement. In 1989, Bernadette Cozart founded the coalition, which is responsible for many urban gardens around Harlem. Cozart's goal is to turn vacant lots into community gardens. This is economically beneficial, and also provides a way for very urban communities to be in touch with nature and each other. The majority of people interested in this project (as noted in 1990) were women. Through these gardens, they were able to participate in and become leaders of their communities. Urban greening exists in other places as well. Beginning in 1994, a group of African-American women in Detroit have developed city gardens, and call themselves the Gardening Angels. Similar garden movements have occurred globally.

The development of vegetarian ecofeminism can be traced to the mid-80s and 90s, where it first appeared in writing. However, the roots of a vegetarian ecofeminist view can be traced back further by looking at sympathy for non-humans and counterculture movements of the 1960s and 1970s. At the culmination of the decade ecofeminism had spread to both coasts and articulated an intersectional analysis of women and the environment. Eventually, challenging ideas of environmental classism and racism, resisting toxic dumping and other threats to the impoverished.

Major critiques

Accused essentialism  
In the 1980s and 1990s ecofeminism began to be heavily critiqued as 'essentialism'. The critics believed ecofeminism to be reinforcing patriarchal dominance and norms. Post structural and third wave feminists argued that ecofeminism equated women with nature and that this dichotomy grouped all women into one category enforcing the very societal norms that feminism is trying to break. However the criticism was based on a category mistake made by those who missed the emerging political critique of patriarchal ideology.

The ascribed essentialism appears in two main areas:

 Ecofeminism demonstrates an adherence to the strict dichotomy, among others, between men and women. Some critiques of ecofeminism note that the dichotomy between women and men and nature and culture creates a dualism that is too stringent and focused on the differences of women and men. In this sense, ecofeminism too strongly correlates the social status of women with the social status of nature, rather than the non-essentialist view that women along with nature have both feminine and masculine qualities, and that just as feminine qualities have often been seen as less worthy, nature is also seen as having lesser value than culture.
 Ecofeminism asserts a divergent view regarding participation in existing social structures. As opposed to radical and liberation-based feminist movements, mainstream feminism is tightly bound with hegemonic social status and strives to promote equality within the existing social and political structure, such as making it possible for women to occupy positions of power in business, industry and politics, using direct involvement as the main tactic for achieving pay equity and influence. In contrast, many ecofeminists oppose active engagement in these areas, as these are the very structures that the movement intends to dismantle.

Ecofeminist and author Noel Sturgeon says in an interview that what anti-essentialists are critiquing is a strategy used to mobilize large and diverse groups of both theorists and activists. Additionally, according to ecofeminist and author Charlene Spretnak, modern ecofeminism is concerned about a variety of issues, including reproductive technology, equal pay and equal rights, toxic pollution, Third World development, and more.

Ecofeminism as it propelled into the 21st century became aware of the criticisms, and in response ecofeminists with a materialist lens began doing research and renaming the topic, i.e. queer ecologies, global feminist environmental justice, and gender and the environment. The essentialism concern was mostly found among North American academics. In Europe and the global South, class, race, gender and species dominations were framed by more grounded materialist understandings.

Socialist feminist critiques 
Social ecologist and feminist Janet Biehl has criticized ecofeminism for focusing too much on a mystical connection between women and nature and not enough on the actual conditions of women. She has also stated that rather than being a forward-moving theory, ecofeminism is an anti-progressive movement for women. The ecofeminist believes that women and nature have a strong bond because of their shared history of patriarchal oppression; whereas, the socialist feminist focuses on gender roles in the political economy. The socialist feminist may oppose the ecofeminist by arguing that women do not have an intrinsic connection with nature; rather, that is a socially constructed narrative.

Rosemary Radford Ruether also critiqued this focus on mysticism over work that focuses on helping women, but argues that spirituality and activism can be combined effectively in ecofeminism.

Intersectionality 
A. E. Kings comments on the relationship between ecofeminism and intersectionality, arguing that the discipline is fundamentally intersectional given that it is built upon the idea that patriarchal violence against women is connected to domination of nature. Simultaneously, Kings warns against the presumption of intersectional thought as a natural component of ecofeminism, so as not to disregard the distinctive academic contributions of intersectional feminists.

Feminist thought surrounding ecofeminism grew in some areas as it was criticized; vegetarian ecofeminism contributed intersectional analysis; and ecofeminisms that analyzed animal rights, labor rights and activisms as they could draw lines among oppressed groups. To some, the inclusion of non-human animals also came to be viewed as essentialist.

Wild animal suffering 
Catia Faria argues that the view held by ecofeminists that the largest source of harm to non-human animals in the wild is patriarchal culture and that the conservation of nature and natural processes is the best way to help these individuals is mistaken. She instead contends that natural processes are a source of immense suffering for these animals and that we should work towards alleviating the harms they experience, as well as eliminating patriarchal sources of harm, such as hunting.

Theorists

Judi Bari – Bari was a principal organizer of the Earth First! movement and experienced sexist hostility.
Françoise d'Eaubonne – Called upon women to lead an ecological revolution in order to save the planet. This entailed revolutionizing gender relations and human relations with the natural world.
Greta Gaard – Greta Gaard is an American ecofeminist scholar and activist. Her major contributions to the field connect ideas of queer theory, vegetarianism, and animal liberation. Her major theories include ecocriticism which works to include literary criticism and composition to inform ecofeminism and other feminist theories to address a wider range of social issues within ecofeminism. She is an ecological activist and leader in the U.S. Green Party, and the Green Movement.
Susan Griffin - A radical feminist philosopher, essayist and playwright particularly known for her innovative, hybrid-form ecofeminist works. A Californian, she taught as an adjunct professor at UC Berkeley as well as at Stanford University and California Institute of Integral Studies.
Sallie McFague – A prominent ecofeminist theologian, McFague uses the metaphor of God's body to represent the universe at large. This metaphor values inclusive, mutualistic and interdependent relations amongst all things.
Carolyn Merchant – Historian of science who taught at University of California, Berkeley for many years. Her book The Death of Nature: Women, Ecology and the Scientific Revolution is a classic ecofeminist text.
Mary Mellor – UK sociologist who moved to ecofeminist ideas from an interest in cooperatives. Her books Breaking the Boundaries and Feminism and Ecology are grounded in a materialist analysis.
Maria Mies – Mies is a German social critic who has been involved in feminist work throughout Europe and India. She works particularly on the intersections of patriarchy, poverty, and the environment on a local and global scale.
Adrian Parr – A cultural and environmental theorist. She has published eight books and numerous articles on environmental activism, feminist new materialism, and imagination. Most notable is her trilogy – Hijacking Sustainability, The Wrath of Capital, and Birth of a New Earth.
Val Plumwood – Val Plumwood, formerly Val Routley, was an Australian ecofeminist intellectual and activist, who was prominent in the development of radical ecosophy from the early 1970s through the remainder of the 20th century. In her work Feminism and the Mastery of Nature she describes the relationship of mankind and the environment relating to an eco-feminist ideology.
Alicia Puleo – The author of several books and articles on ecofeminism and gender inequality, Alicia Puleo has been characterized as "arguably Spain's most prominent explicator-philosopher of the worldwide movement or theoretical orientation known as ecofeminism."
Rosemary Radford Ruether – Has written 36 books and over 600 articles exploring the intersections of feminism, theology, and creation care. Ruether was the first person to connect the domination of the earth with the oppression of women.
Ariel Salleh – Australian ecofeminist with a global perspective; a founding editor of the journal Capitalism Nature Socialism; author of three books and some 200 articles examining links with deep and social ecology, green politics and eco-socialism.
Vandana Shiva – Shiva is a scientist by training, prolific author and Indian ecofeminist activist. She was a participant in the Chipko movement of the 1970s, which used non-violent activism to protest and prevent deforestation in the Garhwal Himalayas of Uttarakhand, India, then in Uttar Pradesh. Her fight against genetically modified organisms (GMOs) (together with the fights led by Rachel Carson against DDT and Erin Brockovich against hexavalent chromium) has been described as an example of ecofeminist position. 
Charlene Spretnak – Spretnak is an American writer largely known for her writing on ecology, politics and spirituality. Through these writings Spretnak has become a prominent ecofeminist. She has written many books which discuss ecological issues in terms of effects with social criticisms, including feminism. Spretnak's works had a major influence in the development of the Green Party. She has also won awards based on her visions on ecology and social issues as well as feminist thinking.
Starhawk – An American writer and activist, Starhawk is known for her work in spiritualism and ecofeminism. She advocates for social justice in issues surrounding nature and spirit. These social justice issues fall under the scope of feminism and ecofeminism. She believes in fighting oppression through intersectionality and the importance of spirituality, eco consciousness and sexual and gender liberation.
Vanessa Lemgruber – Lemgruber is a Brazilian lawyer, writer, activist, and ecofeminist. She defends the Doce river in Brazil and advocates for water quality and zero waste movements.
Douglas Vakoch – An American ecocritic whose edited volumes include Ecofeminism and Rhetoric: Critical Perspectives on Sex, Technology, and Discourse (2011), Feminist Ecocriticism: Environment, Women, and Literature (2012), Dystopias and Utopias on Earth and Beyond: Feminist Ecocriticism of Science Fiction (2021), Ecofeminist Science Fiction: International Perspectives on Gender, Ecology, and Literature (2021), The Routledge Handbook of Ecofeminism and Literature (2023), (with Nicole Anae) Indian Feminist Ecocriticism (2022), and (with Sam Mickey) Ecofeminism in Dialogue (2018), Literature and Ecofeminism: Intersectional and International Voices (2018), and Women and Nature?: Beyond Dualism in Gender, Body, and Environment (2018).
Karen J. Warren – Warren received her B.A. in philosophy from the University of Minnesota (1970) and her Ph.D. from the University of Massachusetts-Amherst in 1978. Before her long tenure at Macalester College, which began in 1985, Warren was Professor of Philosophy at St. Olaf College in the early 1980s. Warren was the Ecofeminist-Scholar-in-Residence at Murdoch University in Australia. In 2003, she served as an Oxford University Round Table Scholar and as Women's Chair in Humanistic Studies at Marquette University in 2004. She has spoken widely on environmental issues, feminism, critical thinking skills and peace studies in many international locations including Buenos Aires, Gothenburg, Helsinki, Oslo, Manitoba, Melbourne, Moscow, Perth, the U.N. Earth Summit in Rio de Janeiro (1992), and San Jose.
Laura Wright — Wright proposed Vegan studies as an academic discipline.

See also 

 Chipko movement
 Climate change and gender
 Cottagecore
 Critical Animal Studies
 Deep ecology
 Deep Green Resistance
 Ecofeminist art
 Green syndicalism
 Intersectionality
 List of ecofeminist authors
 Queer ecology
 Romanticism
 Sexecology
 Social ecology
 Vegan studies
 Vegetarian ecofeminism
 Women and the environment through history

References

Further reading

Key works
 Ancient Futures: Learning from Ladakh, by Helena Norberg-Hodge
 The Body of God by Sallie McFague
 The Chalice & The Blade: Our History, Our Future, by Riane Eisler
 The Death of Nature: Women, Ecology, and the Scientific Revolution by Carolyn Merchant
 Ecofeminism by Maria Mies and Vandana Shiva
 Ecofeminism in Latin America by Mary Judith Ross
 Ecofeminist Philosophy by Karen J. Warren
 Environmental Culture by Val Plumwood
 Feminism and the Mastery of Nature by Val Plumwood
 Gaia & God: An Ecofeminist Theology of Earth Healing by Rosemary Radford Ruether
 Integrating Ecofeminism, Globalization, and World Religions by Rosemary Radford Ruether
 Neither Man Nor Beast by Carol J. Adams
 Refuge: An Unnatural History of Family and Place by Terry Tempest Williams
 The Resurgence of the Real: Body, Nature, and Place in a Hypermodern World by Charlene Spretnak
 Sacred Longings: Ecofeminist theology and Globalization by Mary Grey
 The Sexual Politics of Meat by Carol J. Adams
 Silent Spring by Rachel Carson
 The Spiral Dance by Starhawk
 Staying Alive: Women, Ecology and Development by Vandana Shiva
 Thinking Green! Essays on Environmentalism, Feminism, and Nonviolence by Petra Kelly
 Tomorrow's Biodiversity by Vandana Shiva
 Woman and Nature: The Roaring Inside Her by Susan Griffin
 Breaking the Boundaries by Mary Mellor
 Feminism and Ecology by Mary Mellor
 Ecofeminism as Politics: nature, Marx, and the postmodern by Ariel Salleh
 The Greening of Costa Rica by Ana Isla

Anthologies
 Animals and Women: Feminist Theoretical Explorations, edited by Carol J. Adams and Josephine Donovan
 Dystopias and Utopias on Earth and Beyond: Feminist Ecocriticism of Science Fiction, edited by Douglas A. Vakoch
Ecofeminism: Women, Animals, Nature, edited by Greta Gaard
 Ecofeminism: Women, Culture, Nature, edited by Karen J. Warren with editorial assistance from Nisvan Erkal
 EcoFeminism & Globalization: exploring culture, context and religion, edited by Heather Eaton & Lois Ann Lorentzen
 Ecofeminism and Rhetoric: Critical Perspectives on Sex, Technology, and Discourse, edited by Douglas A. Vakoch
 Ecofeminism and the Sacred, edited by Carol J. Adams
 Ecofeminism in Dialogue, edited by Douglas A. Vakoch and Sam Mickey
 Ecofeminist Science Fiction: International Perspectives on Gender, Ecology, and Literature, edited by Douglas A. Vakoch
 Eco-Sufficiency & Global Justice: Women write Political Ecology, edited by Ariel Salleh
Feminist Ecocriticism: Environment, Women, and Literature, edited by Douglas A. Vakoch
Indian Feminist Ecocriticism, edited by Douglas A. Vakoch and Nicole Anae
 Literature and Ecofeminism: Intersectional and International Voices, edited by Douglas A. Vakoch and Sam Mickey
 The Politics of Women's Spirituality: Essays on the Rise of Spiritual Power within the Feminist Movement, edited by Charlene Spretnak
 Readings in Ecology and Feminist Theology, edited by Mary Heather MacKinnon and Moni McIntyre
 Reclaim the Earth, edited by Leonie Caldecott & Stephanie Leland
 Reweaving the World: The Emergence of Ecofeminism, edited by Irene Diamond and Gloria Feman Orenstein
 The Routledge Handbook of Ecofeminism and Literature, edited by Douglas A. Vakoch
 Women and Nature?: Beyond Dualism in Gender, Body, and Environment, edited by Douglas A. Vakoch and Sam Mickey
 Women Healing Earth: Third World Women on Ecology, Feminism, and Religion, edited by Rosemary Radford Ruether
  GUIA ECOFEMINISTA - mulheres, direito, ecologia, written by Vanessa Lemgruber edited by Ape'Ku

Journal articles

 
 
 
 
Mann, Susan A. 2011. Pioneers of U.S. Ecofeminism and Environmental Justice, "Feminist Formations" 23(2): 1-25.

 Salleh, Ariel (1984) 'From Feminism to Ecology', Social Alternatives, Vol. 4, No. 3, 8-12.
 Salleh, Ariel (2019) 'Ecofeminist Sociology as a New Class Analysis' in Klaus Dorre and Brigitte Aulenbacher (eds.), Global Dialogue, International Sociological Association Newsletter: Vol. 9, No. 1.

Fiction

 A Door Into Ocean by Joan Slonczewski
 Always Coming Home by Ursula K. Le Guin
 Buffalo Gals, Won't You Come Out Tonight by Ursula K. Le Guin
 The Fifth Sacred Thing by Starhawk
 The Gate to Women's Country by Sheri S. Tepper
 The Holdfast Chronicles by Suzy McKee Charnas
 Native Tongue by Suzette Haden Elgin
 The Parable of the Sower by Octavia Butler
  Prodigal Summer by Barbara Kingsolver
 Surfacing by Margaret Atwood
 The Wanderground by Sally Miller Gearhart
 Woman on the Edge of Time by Marge Piercy
 The Kin of Ata are Waiting for You by Dorothy Bryant
 Bear by Marian Engel
 The Temple of My Familiar by Alice Walker
 Sultana's Dream by Begum Rokeya Sakhawat Hossain

 Poetry The Sea of Affliction (1987, reprinted 2010) by Rosemarie Rowley

 External links 

 Ecofeminism: Toward global justice and planetary health Feminist Greta Gaard and Lori Gruen's ecofeminist framework
 "An Ecology of Knowledge: Feminism, Ecology and the Science and Religion Discourse" Metanexus Institute by Lisa Stenmark
 "Ecofeminism and the Democracy of Creation" by Catherine Keller (2005) ; cf. Carol P. Christ, "Ecofeminism", in Michel Weber and Will Desmond (eds.), Handbook of Whiteheadian Process Thought'', Frankfurt / Lancaster, ontos verlag, 2008, pp. 87–98.
 "Toward a Queer Ecofeminism" by Greta Gaard
 Feminism and ecology: the same struggle? – The shaping of ecofeminism by Marijke Colle
 Feminist Environmental Philosophy by Karen Warren
 What is Ecofeminism? Perlego Books

 
Articles containing video clips
Environmental humanities
Environmental movements
Environmental social science concepts
Environmentalism
Feminism and health
Feminism and history
Feminist movements and ideologies
Feminist theory
Green politics
Left-wing politics
Liberalism
Political ecology
Progressivism
Relational ethics
Social justice